Venu Madhav may refer to:
 Nerella Venu Madhav (1932–2018), Padmashri winning ventriloquist (mimicry artist)
 Venu Madhav (actor) (1969-2019), Telugu actor